Children of War may refer to:

  Children of War (2009 film), an American film based on the war in northern Uganda
  Children of War (2014 film), an Indian film based on the Bangladesh Liberation War
  the military use of children